This members of the Northern Territory Legislative Assembly from 2008 to 2012 are listed below.

Notes
 Arafura MLA and former Deputy Chief Minister Marion Scrymgour resigned from the Labor on 4 June 2009 and sat as an independent. She rejoined the Labor Party on 4 August 2009.
 MacDonnell MLA Alison Anderson resigned from the Labor Party on 4 August 2009 to sit as an independent. She subsequently joined the Country Liberal Party on 9 September 2011.
 Araluen CLP MLA Jodeen Carney resigned on 3 September 2010. CLP candidate Robyn Lambley won the resulting by-election was held on 9 October 2010.
 Drysdale CLP MLA Ross Bohlin lost party preselection to contest his seat for the next election, and announced his intention to run as an independent on 11 July 2012.

See also
2008 Northern Territory general election
2012 Northern Territory general election
2010 Araluen by-election

Members of Northern Territory parliaments by term
21st-century Australian politicians